The Secret of Annexe 3 is a crime novel by Colin Dexter, the seventh novel in Inspector Morse series.

Plot summary
As the novel begins, Margaret Bowman of Charlbury Drive Chipping Norton is off to a funeral. Her husband, left alone, finds an angry letter, apparently from a lover, in his wife's handbag.

The guests of Haworth Hotel rise late on New Year's Day, with one exception, the guest in Annexe 3 who missed New Year's Day completely. He lies dead in his room on the blood-soaked bed.

After the murder, Inspector Morse, with the help of the receptionist Miss Sarah Jonstone, examines the letters and phone messages booking the various rooms at the hotel. Discovering the non-existent address, he deduces that a postman must be involved.

Thomas Bowman, the postman, turns out to be the corpse, and his wife and her lover are the instigators of the murder. Winston Grant, a black musician, was hired to provide the alibi.

Adaptations
Although the narratives differ, this novel provided the inspiration for the Inspector Morse television episode The Secret of Bay 5B, the last episode of series 3, aired in 1989.

Publication history
1986, London: Macmillan , Pub date October 1986, Hardback
1987, New York: St. Martin's Press , Pub date November 1987, Hardback

References

Further reading 
 Bishop, David, The Complete Inspector Morse: From the Original Novels to the TV Series London: Reynolds & Hearn (2006)  
 Bird, Christopher, The World of Inspector Morse: A Complete A-Z Reference for the Morse Enthusiast Foreword by Colin Dexter, London: Boxtree (1998) 

1986 British novels
Novels by Colin Dexter
Novels set in hotels
Macmillan Publishers books